These are the results of the women's K-2 500 metres competition in canoeing at the 2004 Summer Olympics. The K-2 event is raced by two-person canoe sprint kayaks.

Medalists

Heats
The 15 teams first raced in two heats.  The top three finishers in each heat advanced directly to the final, and the remaining nine teams advanced to the semifinal.  No teams were eliminated in the heats.  The heats were raced on August 24.

Semifinal
The top three finishers in the semifinal race qualified for the final, joining the six teams that had advanced directly from the heats.  The other six teams were eliminated.   The semifinal was raced on August 26.

Final
The final was raced on August 28.

References
2004 Summer Olympics Canoe sprint results 
Sports-reference.com 2004 women's K-2 500 m results.
Yahoo! Sports Athens 2004 Summer Olympics Canoe/Kayak Results

Women's K-2 0500
Olymp
Women's events at the 2004 Summer Olympics